Patrick Ochan (born 8 August 1988 in Kampala) is an Ugandan cricketer who played in the 2006 U-19 Cricket World Cup in Sri Lanka. He has also played List A cricket for the Uganda national cricket team.

After the 2007 ICC World Cricket League Division Three tournament in Australia, Ochan went on the run and sought asylum in Australia. He is now in Adelaide, playing for West Torrens Cricket Club in the South Australian Grade Cricket competition.

References

1988 births
Living people
Ugandan cricketers
Cricketers from Kampala
Ugandan emigrants to Australia